According to the UK Space Agency, there are 173 space companies currently operating in Scotland as of May 2021. These include spacecraft manufacturers, launch providers, downstream data analyzers, and research organisations.

In 2017/18 it was estimated that the space industry in Scotland employed approximately 8,000 people with an annual growth rate of 12% between 2013 and 2018. London Economics published a report projecting £2billion in income for Scotland's space cluster by 2030. Scottish space industry jobs represent almost 1 in 5 of all UK space industry employment.

Scottish Space Groups

Space Scotland 
Space Scotland (formerly Scottish Space Leadership Council) is an industry coordinating body created to promote the Scottish space industry. In conjunction with Scottish Space Academic Forum and The Scottish Government, they have published A Strategy for Space in Scotland 2021. This document describes a plan for the continued development of the Scottish space industry over the next decade.

Space Centres in Scotland

Higgs Centre for Innovation 
The Higgs Centre for Innovation was created by the Science and Technology Facilities Council at the Royal Observatory Edinburgh to incubate space startups, provide the sector with facilities for building and demonstrating space technologies, and to give doctoral candidates startup and entrepreneurial experience. The facilities include cleanrooms, cryostats, vibration shaker tables, thermal chambers, and EMC testing facilities. The Higgs Centre is one of four ESA Business Incubation Centres in the UK.

Bayes Centre 
The Bayes Centre, at the University of Edinburgh, hosts a coordinating hub for space and satellite data science activities that brings together academia, NGOs, the space industry, and governmental organisations with a focus on commercializing university research.

Spaceports 
There are multiple spaceports in varying phases of development in Scotland. Two Scottish spaceports, SaxaVord and Sutherland, are scheduled to have their first launches in 2022.

SaxaVord 
SaxaVord Spaceport is located on the isle of Unst, in the Shetland Islands. It is planned to host Lockheed Martin's first rocket launches as well as Edinburgh-based Skyrora's launches.

Sutherland Space Hub 
Sutherland spaceport is located in the north of the Scottish mainland. It currently has six launch contracts with rocket maker Orbex which is headquartered in Forres, Scotland.

Space Data Companies

Omanos Analytics 
Omanos Analytics, based in Glasgow, combines earth observation data with ground source data to track operations of infrastructure projects such as mining, logging, and rubber plantations. These are monitored for their environmental and community impact, especially in hostile and low-infrastructure regions with the goal of supporting sustainable development.

Ecometrica 
Ecometrica, with offices in Edinburgh, has developed an end-to-end environmental SaaS whose purpose is to analyze earth observation data combined with on-the-ground data collection sources to identify risks and opportunities for their customers. The software assists sustainability planning, operations and reporting.

Space Intelligence 
Space Intelligence, based in Edinburgh, uses machine learning on remote sensing satellite data to classify landscapes, especially around deforestation and forest degradation, to provide businesses seeking to reduce their environmental impact with actionable data.

Trade in Space 
Trade in Space, based in Edinburgh, uses satellite data to create smart contracts via the blockchain in real time for commodities such as coffee.

Carbomap 
Carbomap, based in Edinburgh, builds tools to analyze and develop insights from environmental data from remote sensing satellites and UAVs. They work with governments, NGOs, and research institutes to map out forests and monitor deforestation.

EarthBlox 
EarthBlox, based in Edinburgh, produces a no-code SaaS interface to obtain and analyze data from remote sensing satellites for applications ranging from flood damage, crop production, and climate change.

AstroSat 
AstroSat, based in Edinburgh, combines satellite data with ground source data to monitor and analyze problems ranging from fuel poverty in Britain, natural disaster response, and construction monitoring.

Bird.i 
Bird.i, based in Glasgow, uses satellite data to provide businesses with monitoring of infrastructure projects such as mining, oil and gas, and construction. It was acquired in April 2020 by Zonda.

Rocket Makers

Skyrora 
Skyrora, based in Edinburgh, builds rockets suited for the launch of small satellites. The Skyrora XL rocket is intended to launch payloads of up to 315 kg into a sun-synchronous orbit between 500 and 1000 km or a polar orbit between 200 and 1000 km. Their first scheduled launch is in 2023.

Orbex 
Orbex, based in Forres (about 25 miles northeast of Inverness), is developing a rocket called Prime that is intended to launch nano satellites into a polar orbit. The first launch is targeted to end of 2022.

References 

Scotland
Industry in Scotland
Science and technology in Scotland